David Caveda (also transliterated as David Kabeda) (born July 31, 1979) is an Israeli professional football (soccer) player who played most of his career in Tzafririm Holon.

Honours
Second Division
1999-00

References

External links
 

1979 births
Living people
Place of birth missing (living people)
Ethiopian Jews
Ethiopian emigrants to Israel
Citizens of Israel through Law of Return
Israeli footballers
Association football midfielders
Hapoel Tzafririm Holon F.C. players
Ironi Ramla F.C. players
F.C. Shikun HaMizrah players
Liga Leumit players
Israeli Premier League players
Jewish Israeli sportspeople
Jewish footballers
Israeli people of Ethiopian-Jewish descent
Sportspeople of Ethiopian descent